Skafida Peak is the peak rising to 2071 m near the north end of the main ridge of Sentinel Range in Ellsworth Mountains, Antarctica.  It has steep and partly ice-free east and south slopes, and surmounts Newcomer Glacier to the east.  The peak is named after the medieval fortress of Skafida in Southeastern Bulgaria.

Location
US mapping in 1961.

Maps
 Newcomer Glacier.  Scale 1:250 000 topographic map.  Reston, Virginia: US Geological Survey, 1961.
 Antarctic Digital Database (ADD). Scale 1:250000 topographic map of Antarctica. Scientific Committee on Antarctic Research (SCAR). Since 1993, regularly updated.

Notes

References
 Skafida Peak. SCAR Composite Gazetteer of Antarctica.
 Bulgarian Antarctic Gazetteer. Antarctic Place-names Commission. (details in Bulgarian, basic data in English)

External links
 Skafida Peak. Copernix satellite image

Ellsworth Mountains
Bulgaria and the Antarctic
Mountains of Ellsworth Land